John Maurice Mills (born 28 March 1953) is a retired British international swimmer.

Swimming career
He competed at the 1972 Summer Olympics and the 1976 Summer Olympics.

He represented England and won a bronze medal in the 4 x 200m freestyle relay, at the 1970 British Commonwealth Games in Edinburgh, Scotland. Eight years later he won double silver in the 100 metres butterfly and the 4 x 100m medley relay, at the 1978 Commonwealth Games in Montreal, Canada. He also won the ASA National Championship title in the 100 metres butterfly (1972, 1976, 1977, 1978) and the 1971 title in the 200 metres butterfly. He also won the 1971 ASA British National 1500 metres freestyle title.

References

External links
 

1953 births
Living people
British male swimmers
Olympic swimmers of Great Britain
Swimmers at the 1972 Summer Olympics
Swimmers at the 1976 Summer Olympics
Swimmers at the 1970 British Commonwealth Games
Swimmers at the 1978 Commonwealth Games
Commonwealth Games medallists in swimming
Commonwealth Games silver medallists for England
Commonwealth Games bronze medallists for England
World Aquatics Championships medalists in swimming
European Aquatics Championships medalists in swimming
Place of birth missing (living people)
Medallists at the 1970 British Commonwealth Games
Medallists at the 1978 Commonwealth Games